Martin Simon Butcher (born 19 May 1958) is a former English cricketer. He was a right-handed batsman. He was born at Thornton Heath, Surrey.

Butcher made a single first-class appearance for Surrey against Oxford University at the University Parks in 1982. He wasn't required to bat during the match, while with the ball he bowled one wicketless overs, with the match ending in a draw. This was his only major appearance for Surrey.

Butcher comes from a large extended family of cricketers. His brother, Alan, and nephew, Mark, both played Test cricket for England. His other brother, Ian, and nephew, Gary, both played first-class cricket. His niece, Bryony, has played women's cricket to a high level domestically.

References

External links

1958 births
Living people
People from Thornton Heath
English cricketers
Surrey cricketers